The March of the Living Digital Archive Project, begun in 2013, aims to gather Holocaust testimony from Canadian survivors who have participated in the March of the Living.  Since 1988, Holocaust survivors have traveled to Poland with young students on the March of the Living to share their Holocaust stories in the locations they transpired.

In addition to gathering thousands of hours of Canadian Holocaust survivor testimony that currently exists, the project sends teams of videographers to Poland on ongoing March of the Living trips to capture the stories of the survivors, as they are being shared with the students. The goals is for these stories to serve as an important Holocaust educational resource, especially when survivors are no longer able to accompany the students on their overseas trips.

The project also involves editing portions of survivor stories into smaller, more manageable anecdotes. These video vignettes are especially suitable for younger audiences raised during the Internet age. The edited segments have been posted on line at the Canadian March of the Living Digital Archive Project website, as well as featured at educational programs and public Holocaust commemoration ceremonies.

The MOL Digital Archive Project differs from other Holocaust survivor archives in two major ways:

 Much of the testimony is recorded in front of a live audience of young people, in the location where the survivor’s story actually took place. The transmission of memory from one generation to the next, in the very places their personal tragedies unfolded, adds a unique emotional and educational component not found in many other testimonies.
 The primary purpose of the archive is not historical or academic. Rather, it is to use the survivors experiences to teach the story of the Holocaust, as well as impart humanistic and universal values, such as love, tolerance, kindness and compassion.

Support

The Canadian March of the Living Digital Archive Project has received support through grants from Citizenship & Immigration Canada - Multiculturalism Section, the Claims Conference and individual philanthropy, including donations from Canadian philanthropists Laura and Dennis Bennie.

The project was initiated by March of the Living Canada, a department of Canada Israel Experience, which is sponsored by Jewish Federations of Canada-UIA. The project director is award winning (Gemini Awards, Toronto International Film Festival) filmmaker Naomi Wise.
It was established and overseen by Eli Rubenstein, March of the Living Director, and Evan Zelikovitz, community volunteer, who is the lay chair of the initiative.

Achievements

Several of the Canadian March of the Living Digital Archive Project documentaries have received critical acclaim and wide public exposure.

These include:

Twice Liberated

88-year-old Holocaust survivor Joe Mandel unexpectedly reunites with his World War II liberator Mickey Dorsey on the 2012 March of the Living. The film premiered at the opening of the March of the Living Exhibit at the United Nations (When You Listen to a Witness You Become a Witness) on Tuesday, 28 January 2014.

Reunions

Polish Holocaust survivor Sidney Zoltak returns to his hometown of Siemiatycze in northeast Poland to thank the Polish rescuer who saved him from Nazis.

The film was screened at the Hamilton Jewish Film Festival, Vancouver Jewish Film Festival, and the Big Sky Documentary Film Festival.

Blind Love: A Holocaust Journey to Poland with Man’s Best Friend

This documentary follows six blind Israelis traveling to Poland with the help of their guide dogs, to learn about the Holocaust. The film, narrated by acclaimed CBC radio host Michael Enright, received significant exposure and critical acclaim in the Canadian, American and Israeli media. Blind Love premièred in November 2015 as part of Holocaust Education Week in Toronto, with the co-sponsorship of the Toronto Jewish Film Festival. It was also broadcast on the CBC's Canadian specialty channel Documentary in late 2015.

Auschwitz-Birkenau: 70 Years After Liberation..A Warning to Future Generations

In January 2015, on the eve of the 70th anniversary of the liberation Auschwitz-Birkenau, five Canadian Auschwitz  survivors - along with participants in the March of the Living - recall their experiences in Auschwitz-Birkenau and the lessons to be reminded of on this historic date.

The film premiered at the 70th anniversary commemorations of the liberation of Auschwitz-Birkenau on January 27, 2015 at a ceremony on Parliament Hill, in Ottawa, Canada, and was attended by politicians, dignitaries and community representatives including Jason Kenney, Canada’s Minister of Citizenship and Immigration.

Czeslawa & Olga

Polish Righteous Among the Nations Czeslawa Zak reunites with one of the people she rescued, Olga Kost, in Israel for the last time, fulfilling one of her life’s dreams

The film is shown yearly at the University of Warsaw in a ceremony honoring the Righteous Among the Nations, to an audience of about 1,000 attending the annual March of the Living

Witness: Passing the Torch of Holocaust Memory to New Generations
 
In addition to the over 30 films produced thus far, several March of the Living Digital Archive videos figure prominently in Witness: Passing the Torch of Holocaust Memory to New Generations and the related exhibit (which appeared at the United Nations and the Auschwitz-Birkenau State Museum.) The book and exhibit have incorporated an interactive aspect where the featured survivors, World War II liberators, and Righteous Among the Nations, include an invisible link embedded on their image. When their image is accessed with a smart phone or other device, the viewer is taken to an excerpt of their video testimony on the March of the Living Digital Archives websites or the USC Shoah Foundation Institute for Visual History and Education (created by Steven Spielberg)

References

External links
 Official Website
 March of the Living Canada Official Website

The Holocaust
Jewish organizations based in Canada
Jewish Canadian history
Jewish Polish history